The Winemakers was a reality television series that followed twelve winemakers competing to create and market a wine.  It was broadcast on Public Broadcasting Service (PBS) and was the channel's only competitive reality series.  Season 1 took place in Paso Robles, California.  Season 2 was shot in the Rhone Valley of France and aired on PBS in the fall of 2011.

References 

PBS original programming
South Carolina Educational Television
Television series about wine
2009 American television series debuts
2010s American reality television series